Kumru is a khum (commune) of Thma Puok District in Banteay Meanchey Province in north-western Cambodia.

Villages

 Andoung Khlong(អណ្ដូងខ្លុង)
 Kumru គម្រូ
 Ta Yueng តាយេង
 Aekakpheap ឯកភាព
 Phsar Thmei ផ្សារថ្មី
 Svay Chrum ស្វាយជ្រុំ
 Prey Veng ព្រៃវែង

References

Communes of Banteay Meanchey province
Thma Puok District